Raczkowski (feminine: Raczkowska; plural: Raczkowscy) is a Polish-language and an Ashkenazi Jewish surname. It corresponds to the Lithuanian surname Račkauskas and the Russian Rachkovsky. 

The surname may refer to:
 Andrew Raczkowski (born 1968), American politician
 Bogdan Raczkowski (1888– 1939), Polish engineer
 Damian Raczkowski (born 1975), Polish politician
 Krzysztof Raczkowski (1970-2005), Polish drummer
 Paweł Raczkowski (born 1983), Polish football referee
 Władysław Raczkowski (1893-1959), Polish conductor and composer

See also
 

Polish-language surnames